The Leinster Senior Club Hurling Championship (known for sponsorship reasons as the AIB Leinster GAA Hurling Senior Club Championship) is an annual hurling competition organised by the Leinster Council of the Gaelic Athletic Association and contested by the champion senior clubs in the province of Leinster in Ireland. It is the most prestigious club competition in Leinster hurling.

Introduced in 1971, it was initially a straight knockout tournament open to all 12 county senior champions from the 1970 championship season. The competition is currently limited to the eight champion club teams from the strongest hurling counties in Leinster.

In its current format, the Leinster Club Championship begins in November following the completion of the individual county championships. The eight participating teams compete in a single-elimination tournament which culminates with the final match on the first Sunday in December. The winner of the Leinster Club Championship, as well as being presented with the O'Neill Cup, qualifies for the subsequent All-Ireland Club Championship.

The competition has been won by 18 teams, 10 of which have won it more than once. Kilkenny clubs have accumulated the highest number of victories with 23 wins. Ballyhale Shamrocks is the most successful team in the tournament's history, having won it 12 times. Ballyhale Shamrocks are the reigning champions, having beaten Kilmacud Crokes by 2-22 to2-19 in the 2022 final.

Format

Overview 

The Leinster Championship is a single elimination tournament. Each team is afforded only one defeat before being eliminated from the championship. Pairings for matches are drawn at random and there is no seeding.

Each match is played as a single leg. If a match is drawn there is a period of extra time, however, if both sides are still level at the end of extra time a replay takes place and so on until a winner is found.

Format 

Quarter-finals: Eight teams contest this round. The four winning teams advance directly to the semi-final stage. The four losing teams are eliminated from the championship.

Semi-finals: The two winning teams advance directly to the final. The two losing teams are eliminated from the championship.

Final: The final is contested by the two semi-final winners.

Teams

Qualification

Managers

Managers in the Leinster Championship are involved in the day-to-day running of the team, including the training, team selection, and sourcing of players. Their influence varies from club-to-club and is related to the individual club committees. The manager is assisted by a team of two or three selectors and a backroom team consisting of various coaches.

Qualification for subsequent competitions 

The Leinster Senior Club Hurling Championship winners qualify for the subsequent All-Ireland Senior Club Hurling Championship. The winners contest the All-Ireland semi-finals with the other three provincial representatives.

Titles listed by club

Titles listed by county

List of Finals

Records and statistics

Team 

Most wins: 12:
Ballyhale Shamrocks (1978, 1980, 1983, 1989, 2006, 2008, 2009, 2014, 2018, 2019, 2021, 2022)
Most consecutive wins: 4:
 Ballyhale Shamrocks (2018, 2019, 2021, 2022)
Most appearances in a final: 14:
Ballyhale Shamrocks (1978, 1980, 1983, 1988, 1989, 1991, 2006, 2008, 2009, 2014, 2018, 2019, 2021, 2022)
Most appearances in a final without ever winning: 3
 Kinnitty (1983, 1984, 1985)
 Castletown (1997, 1999, 2001)
 University College Dublin (2000, 2004, 2005)
Most appearances in a final without losing (streak): 8
Ballyhale Shamrocks (2006, 2008, 2009, 2014, 2018, 2019, 2021, 2022)
Most defeats: 6
 Oulart–The Ballagh (1994, 1995, 2010, 2011, 2012, 2013)

Most consecutive appearances

Teams

County representatives

By decade 

The most successful team of each decade, judged by number of Leinster Championship titles, is as follows:

 1970s: 3 for Rathnure (1971-73-77)
 1980s: 3 for Ballyhale Shamrocks (1980-3-89)
 1990s: 4 for Birr (1991-94-97-99)
 2000s: 3 each for Birr (2001-02-07) and Ballyhale Shamrocks (2006-08-09)
 2010s: 3 for Ballyhale Shamrocks (2014-18-19)
 2020s: 2 for Ballyhale Shamrocks (2020-22)

Successful defending 

Only 5 teams of the 14 who have won the championship have ever successfully defended the title. These are:
 Ballyhale Shamrocks on 4 attempts out of 10 (2009, 2019, 2021, 2022)
 Birr in 1 attempts out of 7 (2002)
 Rathnure in 1 attempt out of 6 (1987)
 James Stephens in 1 attempt out of 4 (2005)
 Cuala on 1 attempt out of 1 (2017)

Gaps 

Top five longest gaps between successive championship titles:
 23 years: James Stephens (1981–2004)
 20 years: Camross (1976–1996)
 17 years: Ballyhale Shamrocks (1989–2006)
 11 years: Rathnure (1987–1998)
 11 years: St. Rynagh's (1982–1993)

Top scorer

Overall

Single game

Finals

See also
 South Leinster Senior Club Championship
 List of Leinster Senior Club Hurling Championship winners

References

Sources 
 Roll of Honour on Leinster GAA website

 1